The 2021–22 Santosh Trophy qualifiers is the qualifying round for the 2021–22 Santosh Trophy, the premier competition in India for teams representing their regional and state football associations. A total of 37 teams competed in the qualifiers to decide the 10 places in the final round of the tournament.

Schedule

Venues
 North Zone: 
 Group A → Chandigarh (Sports Complex)
 Group B → New Delhi, Delhi (Jawaharlal Nehru Stadium)
 East Zone: 
 Group A → Bhubaneswar, Odisha (Kalinga Stadium)
 Group B → Kalyani, West Bengal (Kalyani Stadium)
 North-East Zone: 
 Group A → Shillong, Meghalaya (Jawaharlal Nehru Stadium)
 Group B → Imphal, Manipur (Khuman Lampak Main Stadium)
 South Zone: 
 Group A → Bangalore, Karnataka (Bangalore Football Stadium)
 Group B → Kochi, Kerala (Jawaharlal Nehru Stadium)
 West Zone: 
 Group A → Bhavnagar, Gujarat (Maharaja Krishnakumarsinhji Bhavnagar University Ground)
 Group B → Jaipur, Rajasthan (Poornima University Ground)

North Zone

Group A

Group B

East Zone

Group A

Group B

North-East Zone

Group A

Group B

South Zone

Group A

Group B

West Zone

Group A

Group B

Broadcast

 All matches of West Bengal were broadcast on R Plus News TV channel and Aajkaal Facebook page.

 All matches of South Zone Group A and North Zone Group B were broadcast on Sportscast India YouTube channel.

References

 2021–22 Santosh Trophy